Constantine Mavrocordatos (Greek: Κωνσταντίνος Μαυροκορδάτος, Romanian: Constantin Mavrocordat; February 27, 1711November 23, 1769) was a Greek noble who served as Prince of Wallachia and Prince of Moldavia at several intervals between 1730 and 1769. As a ruler he issued reforms in the laws of each of the two Danubian Principalities, ensuring a more adequate taxation and a series of measures amounting to the emancipation of serfs and a more humane treatment of slaves.

Life

First rules
Born in Constantinople (now Istanbul) as a Phanariote member of the Mavrocordatos family, Constantine succeeded his father, Nicholas Mavrocordatos, as Prince of Wallachia in 1730, after obtaining boyar support. He was deprived in the same year, but again ruled the principality five more times from 1731 to 1733, from 1735 to 1741, from 1744 to 1748, from 1756 and 1758 and from 1761 to 1763. He managed to regain control over Oltenia (the Banat of Craiova) through the Treaty of Belgrade from 1739 after the Austro-Turkish War of 1737–39.

He ruled Moldavia four times from 1733 to 1735, from 1741 to 1743, from 1748 to 1749 and in 1769. He entered a personal rivalry with Grigore II Ghica; Ioan Neculce noted "Constantin-Voivode went lengths to replace Grigorie-Voivode's rule in Wallachia (...)", and subsequently "(...) as soon as they were seated on their thrones [during one of Constantine's rules in Wallachia], they began to quarrell and to report each other to the Porte without concealment".

Reforms and downfall

His reigns were distinguished by numerous tentative reforms in the fiscal and administrative systems, partly influenced by those of the Habsburg monarchy during their presence in Oltenia; initiated in Wallachia, they were to be applied consistently in Moldavia as well.

He was responsible for the annulment of several indirect taxes, such as the văcărit (the taxation per head of cattle), and replaced them with a single tax of 10 löwenthaler, which could be paid in four annual "quarters". Faced with the exodus of serfs to neighbouring Transylvania, Mavrocordatos allowed them freedom of movement from one boyar estate to another, in exchange for a 10 löwenthaler fee (the effective abolition of serfdom: 1746 in Wallachia, 1749 in Moldavia). At the same time, he imposed a quitrent, a 12 days-corvée, and allowed the boyars a retinue of serfs (scutelnici) that were exempted from the state tax (and owed taxes only to their liege lord). On these reforms as experienced in Moldavia, Neculce expressed his view that "were he not to have this heavy retinue of his father's, with all those insatiable people, and were he not prone on removing his cousin Grigore-Voivode from Wallachia, there would not have been such plunder in the country".

He forbade owners of slaves from separating married Gypsyes belonging to different masters

The prince attempted to impose a degree of centralism in the face of boyar privilege, and, despite boyar protests, created an administration which relied on a more professional, salaried apparatus, consisting of ispravnici he himself appointed to office, and who could act as judges; he also merged the traditional personal treasury of princes with that of the Wallachian administrative body, and decided to deny boyar title to families whose members no longer held official appointments. In 1761, due to the reforms' effects, the Ban of Oltenia moved his seat from Craiova to Bucharest, leaving the region to be ruled by a kaymakam.

Mavrocordatos was wounded and taken prisoner by the Russian troops of Catherine II, after his resistance in Galaţi during the Fifth Russo-Turkish War, on November 5, 1769. He was taken to Iaşi where he died in captivity. Despite their attempts to have the reforms overturned, boyars had to deal with their effects, as successive rulers confirmed the laws' scope.

Notes

References
Neagu Djuvara, Între Orient şi Occident. Ţările române la începutul epocii moderne, Humanitas, Bucharest, 1995
Constantin C. Giurescu, Istoria Bucureștilor. Din cele mai vechi timpuri pînă în zilele noastre, Ed. Pentru Literatură, Bucharest, 1966
Ion Neculce, Letopiseţul Ţării Moldovei, Chapters XXIII–XXV

1711 births
1769 deaths
Politicians from Istanbul
18th-century people from the Ottoman Empire
Constantine
Rulers of Moldavia
Rulers of Wallachia
18th-century Greek people
Rulers of Moldavia and Wallachia
Constantinopolitan Greeks